Fantasista Utamaro (born 1979) is a Japanese artist based in Brooklyn, New York. Graduating from Tama Art University in textile studies, Utamaro is an artist, illustrator, textiles, graphic designer, and animation director. He uses influences from Japanese pop culture such as animation and Manga in his art. He established Saizen OO with designer Mikio Sakabe. He has received awards from Pictoplasma NYC Film Festival and Silhouette Film Festival Paris 2008.

References 

1979 births
Living people
Animation directors
Japanese artists
Japanese graphic designers
Japanese pop artists
Tama Art University alumni
Artists from Brooklyn